The Weir is a play written by Conor McPherson in 1997. It was first produced at The Royal Court Theatre Upstairs in London, England, on 4 July 1997. It opened on Broadway at the Walter Kerr Theatre on 1 April 1999. As well as several other locations in the UK and the U.S., the play has been performed in Ireland, Germany, the Czech Republic, Slovenia, Australia and Canada.

Plot summary
The play opens in a County Leitrim pub with Brendan, the publican, and Jack, a car mechanic and garage owner. These two begin to discuss their respective days and are soon joined by Jim. The three then discuss Valerie, a pretty young woman from Dublin who has just rented an old house in the area.

Finbar, a businessman, arrives with Valerie, and the play revolves around reminiscences and banter. After a few drinks, the group begin telling stories with a supernatural slant, related to their own experience or those of others in the area, and which arise out of the popular preoccupations of  Irish folklore: ghosts, fairies and mysterious happenings.

After each man (except Brendan) has told a story, Valerie tells her own: the reason why she has left Dublin. Valerie's story is melancholy and undoubtedly true, with a ghostly twist which echoes the earlier tales, and shocks the men who become softer, kinder, and more real. There is the hint that the story may lead to salvation and, eventually, a happy ending for two of the characters. Finbar and Jim leave, and in the last part of the play, Jack's final monologue is a story of personal loss which, he comments, is at least not a ghostly tale but in some ways is nonetheless about a haunting.

The building of a hydroelectric dam, or weir, on a local waterway many years before is mentioned early in the conversation.

Characters 

 Jack, a mechanic and garage owner in his fifties.
 Brendan, the owner of the pub in which the play is set. He is in his thirties.
 Jim, Jack's assistant, in his forties.
 Finbar Mack, a local businessman in his late forties.
 Valerie, a Dublin woman in her thirties.

Productions and cast 
Royal Court Theatre Upstairs, UK (Original cast)
 Finbar, Dermot Crowley
 Jim, Kieran Ahern
 Jack, Jim Norton
 Brendan, Brendan Coyle
 Valerie, Michelle Fairley

National Theatre, Prague, Czech Republic (2000)
 Finbar, Václav Postránecký
 Jim, Jan Hartl
 Jack, Alois Švehlík
 Brendan, Alexej Pyško
 Valerie, Miluše Šplechtová

The Gate Theatre, Dublin (2008)
 Finbar - Denis Conway
 Jim - Mark Lambert
 Jack - Sean McGinley
 Brendan - David Ganly
 Valerie - Genevieve O'Reilly

Irish Repertory Theatre, Off-Broadway (2013)
 Finbar, Sean Gormley
 Jim, John Keating
 Jack, Dan Butler
 Brendan, Billy Carter
 Valerie, Tessa Klein

Donmar Warehouse, London (2013 Revival) 
 Finbar, Risteárd Cooper
 Jim, Ardal O'Hanlon
 Jack, Brian Cox
 Brendan, Peter McDonald
 Valerie, Dervla Kirwan

Rover Rep Theatre, Hamburg
 Finbar, Roger Graves
 Jim, Jeff Caster
 Jack, John Kirby
 Brendan, Dave Duke
 Valerie, Valerie Doyle

Melbourne Theatre Company, Melbourne, Australia 2015
 Finbar, Greg Stone
 Jim, Robert Menzies
 Jack, Peter Kowitz
 Brendan, Ian Meadows
 Valerie, Nadine Garner

Ljubljana National Drama Theatre, Slovenia - performing continuously since April 2001.
 Finbar, Aleš Valič
 Jim, Igor Samobor
 Jack, Ivo Ban
 Brendan, Branko Šturbej
 Valerie, Saša Pavček

Abbey Theatre, Dublin 2022–23
 Finbar, Peter Coonan
 Jim, Marty Rea
 Jack, Brendan Coyle
 Brendan, Sean Fox
 Valerie, Jolly Abraham

Critical response 
Reviews of The Weir have been positive. It won the Laurence Olivier Award for Best New Play of 1997–98. In addition, McPherson won the Critics' Circle Award as the most promising playwright in 1998 as a direct result of the success of The Weir. The play has received lofty praise, such as "beautifully devious," "gentle, soft-spoken, delicately crafted work," and "this is my play of the decade...a modern masterpiece."

The Weir was voted one of the 100 most significant plays of the 20th Century in a poll conducted by the Royal National Theatre, London. It tied at 40th place with Eugene O'Neill's The Iceman Cometh, Samuel Beckett's Endgame and Arthur Miller's A View From The Bridge. The Guardian critic Michael Billington listed The Weir as one of the 101 greatest plays of all time in his 2015 book The 101 Greatest Plays: From Antiquity to the Present.

Awards and nominations  
 1999 Laurence Olivier Award for Best New Play

References

Further reading

External links 
 

1997 plays
Broadway plays
Laurence Olivier Award-winning plays
Plays by Conor McPherson
West End plays
Plays set in Ireland